Gonzalo Oscar Camacho (born August 28, 1984 in Buenos Aires) is a retired Argentine rugby union rugby player, who played for Leicester Tigers, Exeter Chiefs, Harlequins and  on the wing.

Club career
Gonzalo signed for Devon side Exeter Chiefs on 15 June 2011 having also previously played for Harlequins between 2009 and 2011, Camacho is held in high regards by Harlequins fans after scoring the winning try in against Stade Français in the Amlin Cup final.
After much speculation it was announced on 29 May 2013 that Camacho will be leaving Exeter Chiefs and will be joining Leicester Tigers.

International career

Gonzalo made his debut for Argentina against Uruguay on May 31, 2008 and scored twice during the match. Camacho has gone on to become a regular in the Argentina side and following a number of impressive performances for the Argentine national team during the 2012 Rugby Championship which was topped off with Gonzalo scoring for the Pumas, against the New Zealand All Blacks.

Gonzalo was part of Argentine squad for the 2011 Rugby World Cup in New Zealand. His last match was on July 25, 2015 vs. Australia.

References

External links
Aviva Premiership Player Profile

1984 births
Living people
Argentine rugby union players
Rugby union wings
Rugby union players from Buenos Aires
Argentina international rugby union players
Argentine expatriate rugby union players
Expatriate rugby union players in England
Argentine expatriate sportspeople in England
Harlequin F.C. players
Exeter Chiefs players
Leicester Tigers players
Male rugby sevens players
Argentina international rugby sevens players